Pokrovskyi District, known until 2016 as Zhovtnevyi Raion, is an urban district of northern Kryvyi Rih, south-central Ukraine. It is located along the Saksagan. Among other districts of the city, it has about 6,000 hectares making it the largest in terms of area, with a population of over 142,955 people (2001). The district has 271 streets with a total length of 527 km, of which 192 are private sector streets.

References

Urban districts of Kryvyi Rih